Ninne Pelladata is a 1968 Telugu-language comedy film, produced by B. Vittalacharya under the Sri Vital Productions banner and directed by B. V. Srinivas. It stars N. T. Rama Rao and Bharathi , with music composed by Vijaya Krishna Murthy.

Plot
Uma (Bharathi) a beautiful arrogant girl, spoiled due to her mother Jagadamba's (Suryakantham) pampering; she hates men and does not want to marry which makes her father (Raavi Kondala Rao) perturbed. So, he plans with his brother-in-law Anjaneyulu (Ramana Reddy) and he brings his elder brother's son Umapathi (N. T. Rama Rao). In the beginning, their acquaintance starts with petty quarrels and makes her agree to marry him. After the marriage, Uma says she married him just to satisfy her ego, he too challenges that he will bring her down. The rest of the story is how Umapathi teaches a lesson to Uma.

Cast
N. T. Rama Rao as Umapathi
Bharathi as Uma
Ramana Reddy as Anjineyulu
Raavi Kondala Rao
Balakrishna as Ball
Kakarala as Ganapathi
Suryakantham as Jagadamba 
Chaya Devi
Vijaya Lalitha as Nanchari

Soundtrack

Music composed by Vijaya Krishna Murthy. Lyrics were written by C. Narayana Reddy. Music released by Audio Company.

References

External links
 

1968 comedy films
Indian comedy films
1968 films